Daniel Quilter Brown was an American Old Catholic bishop turned Traditionalist Catholic sedevacantist.

Brown was consecrated a bishop on 21 September 1969. The principal consecrator was Hubert A. Rogers of the North American Old Roman Catholic Church. The co-consecrators were James H. Rogers and George T. Koerner. At the time of the consecration, Brown was part of the North American Old Roman Catholic Church. During the year 1971, Brown left the North American Old Roman Catholic Church and became independent.

Brown was significant in the American sedevacantist movement for his 1971 ordinations and episcopal consecration of the American Francis Konrad Schuckardt of the Congregation of Mary Immaculate Queen.

References 

Living people
American Old Catholic bishops
American traditionalist Catholics
Year of birth missing (living people)
Sedevacantists